Jerome L. Greene (1906–1999) was a prominent New York lawyer, real estate investor, and philanthropist.

Early years and Education
Greene was born in Brooklyn in 1909. Greene graduated from Columbia College in 1926 and Columbia Law School in 1928.

Business career
Greene was a founding partner of the Manhattan law firm Marshall, Bratter, Greene, Allison & Tucker. As a real estate investor he was the principal owner of the Carlyle Hotel.

Philanthropy

Over the years, Greene and his wife Dawn contributed over $40 million to Columbia Law School as well as significant contributions to WNYC public radio. The WNYC Greene Space was named in his honor. In 2006, the Jerome L. Greene Foundation donated $200 million to Columbia University, the largest gift that the school had ever received, to establish The Jerome L. Greene Science Center. Greene was a major patron of the arts, among other things, serving as chairman of the board of the Hirshhorn Museum, a member of Lincoln Center's board of directors, and as a trustee of the Juilliard School.

The Jerome L. Greene Foundation 
Greene has his own foundation that was created in 1978.  The foundation supports the arts, education, health and social justice and its assets are valued at $660 million by the end of 2019.

External links

Columbia University Science Center at Enclos

1909 births
1999 deaths
Columbia Law School alumni
20th-century philanthropists
Columbia College (New York) alumni